Rifle Range Halt was a short-lived unstaffed request stop on the GWR Kidderminster to Bewdley loop line which now forms part of the Severn Valley Railway. It was located west of Bewdley tunnel near the “Devil’s Spittleful”, the sandstone outcrop on the nature reserve now managed by the Worcestershire Wildlife Trust.

History
Rifle Range Halt opened in June 1905. The halt was mainly served by a steam railmotor service which was introduced on the Kidderminster - Bewdley - Stourport section of the railway in the same year.  The nearby rifle range was used mainly during the First World War by volunteers from the Yeomanry.

The railmotors operated until 1918, and the halt was closed on 4 October 1920. No remains are now visible.

See also
Severn Valley Railway

References 

Disused railway stations in Worcestershire
Railway stations in Great Britain opened in 1905
Railway stations in Great Britain closed in 1920
1905 establishments in England
1920 disestablishments in England
Former Great Western Railway stations